Danielle Vanessa McGrath, née Carr  (born 6 November 1969 in Sydney) is an Australian former pair skater. With her brother, Stephen Carr, she is a nineteen-time (1980–1998) Australian national champion. They competed at the 1992 Winter Olympics, placing 13th, the 1994 Winter Olympics, placing 11th, and the 1998 Winter Olympics, again placing 13th. They retired from competitive skating following the 1998 Olympic season. During their amateur career, they were coached by Sergei Shakhrai and Kerry Leitch.

In the 2000 Australia Day Honours McGrath was awarded the Medal of the Order of Australia (OAM) for "service to figure skating at Australian and World Championships, and to the Olympic movement".

As of 2006, McGrath was working as a skating coach in Sydney, Australia. She coached Emma Brien / Stuart Beckingham.

Results
GP: Champions Series (Grand Prix)

with Stephen Carr

References

External links
 Figure skating corner profile

1969 births
Living people
Australian female pair skaters
Olympic figure skaters of Australia
Figure skaters at the 1992 Winter Olympics
Figure skaters at the 1994 Winter Olympics
Figure skaters at the 1998 Winter Olympics
Australian figure skating coaches
Female sports coaches
Recipients of the Medal of the Order of Australia